Genevieve Naylor (February 12, 1915 – July 21, 1989) was an American photographer and photojournalist, best known for her photographs of Brazil and as Eleanor Roosevelt's personal photographer.

Early life and education
Genevieve Naylor was born on February 12, 1915, in Springfield, Massachusetts. Her father, Emmett Hay Naylor, a trade association lawyer and her mother, Ruth Houston Caldwell, were married on January 17, 1914.  Genevieve was given the middle name of Hay as a reference to family member John Hay, Abraham Lincoln's personal secretary. Her parents divorced in 1925, when Genevieve was 10 years old. She attended Miss Hall's School and later, at age 16, the Music Box, an arts school, where she studied painting. It was at the Music Box that Genevieve met Misha Reznikoff, her teacher.  Two years later, in 1933, they were in love, and when Misha moved to New York, Genevieve soon followed, and they settled into the Bohemian lifestyle of Greenwich Village living in a studio apartment - a huge converted stable strewn with colorful painting and cigarette boxes and often home to parties with musicians, artists, and fans that lasted for days.  In 1934, Naylor attended an exhibit by photographer Berenice Abbott and so admired Abbott's work that she switched from painting to photography.  Naylor became Abbott's apprentice in 1935, and they maintained their professional relationship until Naylor's death.

Career
At the age of 22, in 1937, Naylor was chosen by Holger Cahill of the Works Progress Administration (WPA) as a photographer for the Harlem Arts Center.  She also worked for the WPA in New Hampshire, Pennsylvania, Washington D.C., and New York. She then worked for the Associated press and was one of the first women photojournalists to be hired by any American news wire services.

In 1940, Genevieve Naylor was assigned by the U.S. State department as part of a team to travel to Brazil.  In an effort to further and strengthen the anti-Nazi relationship between the United States and Brazil and to promote mutual cultural awareness, the U.S. Office of Inter-American Affairs, under the leadership of Nelson Rockefeller, created a team of notable Americans that included Orson Welles, Errol Flynn, and Walt Disney. Genevieve Naylor and her partner (and later husband) Misha Reznikoff arrived in Brazil in October, 1940, where he showed his paintings while Miss Naylor took photographs. Naylor's assignment was to document Brazil's progress toward becoming a modern nation, capture images that would boost war-time morale, foster cultural interchange, and promote the Allied cause. But Naylor, with her energetic and outgoing personality, soon ventured into other milieus, taking photographs of Brazilian workers jammed into trams, school children, religious and street festivals, and various aspects of everyday lives. Because it was war time, film was rationed, and Naylor's equipment was modest.  She had neither flash nor studio lights and had to carefully choose her shots, balancing spontaneity with careful composition.  Of her work, nearly 1,350 photos survived and were preserved.  After her return to the states in 1943, Naylor become only the second woman photographer to be given a one-woman show when her work was exhibited by New York's Museum of Modern Art.

Naylor later spent 15 years as a photographer with Harper's Bazaar and from 1944 to 1980 was a freelance photographer for Vogue, McCall's, Town and Country, Life, Look, Saturday Evening Post, Women's Home Companion, Cosmopolitan, Fortune, Collier's, Glamour, Good Housekeeping, Vanity Fair, Elle, Ladies' Home Journal, Redbook, House Beautiful, Holiday, Mademoiselle, American Home, Seventeen, Better Homes and Gardens, Charm, Bride's, amongst others. She was a war time photographer, covering parts of the Korean War for Look magazine.

Naylor's work has been included in numerous group exhibitions in the United States, the UK, and Europe. The most recent, The New Women Behind the Camera 2021-2022, opened at The Metropolitan Museum of Art, in the summer of 2021, and will continue into 2022 at The National Gallery of Art in Washington, D.C. Her historic alliance with Brazil continues in 2022 with the SESC 24 de Maio, Sao Paulo, exhibition, Raio-Que-O-Parta: Modern Fictions in Brazil

Personal life
Naylor was married to painter Misha Reznikoff with whom she had two sons, Peter Reznikoff and Michael Reznikoff.

References

Books
David Bailey and Martin Harrison (1995) Shots Of Style, Faber and Faber
Martin Harrison (1991) Appearances Rizzoli Books
125 Great Moments of Harper's Bazaar (1993), Wm. Morrow
Naomi Rosenblum (1995) A History of Woman Photographers, Abbeville Press
Kathleen Madden (1996) High Society: 150 Years of Town and Country Magazine, Abrams Books
Robert M. Levine (1998) The Brazilian Photography of Genevieve Naylor, Duke University Press,
Kohle Yohannan (1998) Claire McCardell: Redefining Moderism, Abrams
Genevieve Naylor: An American Photographer In Brazil 1940-1942
George Ermakoff (2012) Genevieve Naylor: An American Photographer in Brazil, G.Ermakoff Books
Nelson, Andrea (2021). The New Women Behind The Camera. The National Gallery of Art
Film Documentary
1998: The History Channel: Brazilian Images: The 1940s Brazilian Photography of Genevieve Naylor
2015: American Masters PBS: Althea

Museum, Institutional, Touring Exhibitions
2022: Raio-Que-O-Parta, Modern Fictions In Brazil, SESC 24 de Maio, Sao Paulo, Brazil
2021: The New Women Behind The Camera, The Metropolitan Museum of Art, New York
2021: The New Women Behind the Camera, The National Gallery of Art, Washington, D.C.
2018: Getty Museum. Icons of Style: A Century of Fashion Photography. Getty Museum Books
2016: Fashion and Textile Museum, London. 150 Years of Harper’s Bazaar 
2014: Victoria Albert Museum: La Moda – Italian Fashion in the 20th Century
2000: Brazil 500 Anos Artes Visuals, Sao Paulo, Brazil
1999: S.E. Museum of Photography, Group Show, Dayton Beach, Florida
1998: Claire McCardell: Redefining Modernism, Museum of Fashion Institute of Technology, New York
1998: Late Modernities in Brazil, Rio de Janeiro and Bela Horizonte
1998: One Woman Exhibition, Brooks Institute of Photography, Santa Barbara, California
1996: Faces and Places In Brazil, United States Information Services Tour, Brazil
1996: Faces and Places In Brazil, Columbia University, New York
1996: Faces and Places in Brazil, Brazilian-American Institute, Washington,D.C.
1995: Claire McCardell Fashion: Fashion Institute of Technology, New York
1994: Faces and Places in Brazil, Sao Paulo Museum, Sao Paulo
1994: Louis Armstrong: A Cultural Legacy, Smithsonian Institution
1991: Appearances, Vitoria-Albert Museum, London
1985: Shots of Style, Victoria-Albert Museum, London
1943: Faces and Places in Brazil, Museum of Modern Art, New York

Gallery Exhibitions
1987: Marie Neikrug Gallery, New York
1993: 20th Century Women Photographers, Staley-Wise Gallery, New York
1995: One Woman Exhibition, Staley-Wise Gallery, New York
1995: Outside Fashion, Howard Greenbery Gallery, New York
1995: Kissing, G.Ray Hawkins Gallery, Los Angeles, California
1995: Kissing, Yancy Richardson Gallery, New York
1996: Wedding Days, G.Ray Hawkins, Los Angeles, California
1997: The Fords: 50 Years of Fashion, Staley-Wise Gallery
1997: Art of the Theatre, Graphics Gallery, East Hampton, New York

1915 births
1989 deaths
American women photographers
20th-century American women artists
20th-century American people